The Leebrick name has its roots as Liebrich in the Butzbach, Germany area.  There the Liebrich family lived for at least 150 years, as documented in the Lutheran Church records there.  The first member of the family came to Pennsylvania in September 1754 from Butzbach via Hamburg on the ship Adventure.  The family settled in the Lancaster, Pennsylvania area, and they remained in Lancaster, Dauphin and Lebanon Counties until at least the 1850s. John Phillip Nicholas Liebrich, the son of the immigrant Liebrich, served with the Pennsylvania Militia in the Revolutionary War Battle of Brandwyine Creek.  About 1820, the original family adopted the more English spelling of today. Some family members migrated west before then, arriving in Iowa and Virginia early in the 19th century.  At least eight other Liebrich/Leebrick families arrived in the 1800s, all related to the original family although some distantly.  Many of these later descendants retain the original German spelling, Liebrich.

==References==

German-language surnames